Blyat is the third studio album by German rapper Capital Bra, released on 29 September 2017 via Auf!Keinen!Fall!.

The album produced six singles, including "Nur noch Gucci", "Ghetto Massari", "Olé olé", "Kuku Sls", "Wer hoch fliegt fällt tief" and "Zweistellige Haftstrafen" of which five received music videos. Capital Bra promoted the album with a limited box set. Blyat debuted on number three in Germany, Austria and five in Switzerland.

Background
Capital Bra released his second studio album Makarov Complex in February 2017 to commercial success. On 16 June 2017, he announced his second studio album Blyat. The first single, "Nur noch Gucci", was released in July.

Release and promotion
Blyat was released by Auf!Keinen!Fall!, Chapter One, and Universal. Internationally, the album was released on 29 September 2017 on all major streaming platforms and physically in Germany, Austria, and Switzerland. 

To promote the album, German rappers Kollegah and Farid Bang announced a limited box set that included the CD, an EP, a DVD, a T-shirt, a poster, three stickers, and a Matryoshka doll.

Track listing

Charts

Certifications

References

Capital Bra albums
2017 albums